The Divisumma 18 was an electronic printing business calculator manufactured by Olivetti in 1972 and designed by Milanese architect Mario Bellini. It was selected for its collection by the Museum of Modern Art in New York.

The skin of the Divisumma 18 is a distinctive color of yellow, made from a combination injection-molded plastic and synthetic rubber.

References

Olivetti calculators
Collection of the Museum of Modern Art (New York City)